"Talk to You" is a song by English rock band Small Faces. It was recorded in 1967 and issued as the B-side of "Here Come the Nice" that peaked at number 12 on the UK Singles Chart.

Song profile 
The song "Talk to you" is a song written and composed by the band's primary songwriters Steve Marriott and Ronnie Lane. Initially, the track was released as the B-side of "Here Come the Nice", the band's eighth official single, and their first on Immediate, whom they signed and transferred to from previous label Decca in 1967. However, it was not intended to be the B-Side, that instead being "Green Circles". For unknown reasons however, this was cancelled.

Three weeks later, the song was issued on the group's eponymous second studio album (not to be confused with the Small Faces' debut album of the same name) on 23 June 1967. Furthermore, the song was included on the group's belatedly released US album There Are But Four Small Faces on 17 March 1968. It was the opening track for an Immediate Records boxset.

It is based on a distorted guitar riff played by Marriott and could be classified as hard rock; a genre the band would further experiment with during their later years, most notably on the single "Tin Soldier", and "Song of a Baker", a track from the 1968 album Ogdens' Nut Gone Flake. As with many other songs by the band, it was recorded at Olympic Studios in London. The song’s subject matter sounds as if it was inspired by Marriott’s relationship with model, Chrissie Shrimpton.

In the song, the singer wants to talk to his girl but such is her fame he can’t get past the doorman outside her flat who mistakes him for a fan. Marriott created a contagious groove for these words and then inserted several shouts and chants to lend the song a distinct sexuality.

Personnel 
 Steve Marriott - electric guitar, lead vocals
Ronnie Lane - bass guitar, backing vocals
 Ian McLagan - hammond organ, piano, backing vocals
 Kenney Jones - drums, percussion

References/Notes

Notes

References 

1967 singles
Small Faces songs
Songs written by Steve Marriott
Songs written by Ronnie Lane
1967 songs